Oye Hoye Pyar Ho Gaya  is a 2013 Punjabi film directed by Aditya Sood and starring Sharry Mann, Jimmy Sharma, Niharika Kareer as the main cast of the film and will release on 14 June 2013. ‘Oye Hoye Pyar Ho Gaya’ is a story of two fun loving friends Sharry (Sharry Mann) and Harry (Rana Ranbir). Sharry falls for Meet (Niharika Kareer), who is daughter of Police Commissioner Shamsher Singh (Yograj Singh).Chamkila (Binnu Dhillon) who is also trying his chances on Meet gets envy of Sharry and tries tarnishing his image in front of Meet's family. Kartar (Jimmy Sharma) son of Police Commissioner and elder brother of meet so he is the main hurdle whom sharry has to pass in the story and commissioner discuss everything with him before taking any decision.

Cast
 Sharry Mann
 Jimmy Sharma
 Niharika Kareer
 Yograj Singh
 Binnu Dhillon
 Rana Ranbir
 Sardar Sohi
 Prakash gaidu
 Bhotu Shah
 Kake Shah

Reception
The Times of India gave the film a poor review, calling out issues with the directing, storyline and acting. The Tribune gave a mixed review, lamenting the film's story but called Mann's performance as a first time actor decent and highlighted the film's songs.

References

External links 

2013 films
Punjabi-language Indian films
2010s Punjabi-language films